"Girls Have Fun" is a song by American rapper Tyga featuring rappers G-Eazy and Rich the Kid. It was released on January 23, 2019, by Last Kings Music and Empire Distribution as the fifth single from Tyga's seventh studio album Legendary.

Background
"Girls Have Fun" is Tyga's second single of 2019, following the release of "Floss In The Bank" less than two weeks prior.

Charts

Certifications

References

2019 singles
2019 songs
G-Eazy songs
Rich the Kid songs
Songs written by Tyga
Songs written by DJ Snake
Empire Distribution singles
Songs written by Rich the Kid
Songs written by G-Eazy
Tyga songs